Séance on a Wet Afternoon is a 1964 British thriller film directed by Bryan Forbes, and starring Kim Stanley, Richard Attenborough, Nanette Newman, Mark Eden and Patrick Magee. Based on the 1961 novel by Mark McShane, the film follows a mentally unstable medium who convinces her husband to kidnap a child so she can help the police solve the crime and achieve renown for her abilities. Kim Stanley was nominated for the Academy Award for Best Actress for her role in the film.

Plot
Myra Savage (Stanley) is a medium who holds séances in her home. Her husband Billy (Attenborough), unable to work because of asthma and cowed by Myra's domineering personality, assists in her séances. Myra's life and psychic work are dominated by her relationship with the spirit of her son Arthur, who died at birth.

At Myra's insistence, Billy kidnaps Amanda (Donner), the young daughter of a wealthy couple, Mr and Mrs Clayton (Eden and Newman), confining her in a room in the Savage home, whilst Myra impersonates a nurse to deceive the girl into believing she is hospitalised. Myra insists she is "borrowing" the girl to demonstrate her psychic abilities to the police in helping them find her. Although they ask for a £25,000 ransom, they plan to return the money with the girl after Myra has become famous for helping find her.  Myra visits the Claytons, stating that she is a professional medium and claiming that she had a dream involving their daughter; Clayton is dismissive but his wife believes that Myra may know something. Mrs Clayton then comes to one of Myra's seances.

After Billy hides Amanda, anticipating (correctly) the police coming to the house to investigate, he collects the ransom money, burying it in their garden before taking Amanda back to their house, but she has a high temperature and Billy wants to get a doctor, which Myra violently disagrees with.  Myra's plan goes awry as her unsteady mental health begins to fray. Believing that her dead son Arthur wants Amanda to be with him, she tells Billy to kill her; he wants to refuse, realising that his wife is completely unhinged, but he seems to lack the will power to resist her.  He takes Amanda into the woods and places her under a tree; it is not clear if she is dead or just sedated.

When the police ask Myra to conduct a séance to help them find the missing girl – as she had hoped they would – she breaks down during the séance and reveals, as if in a psychic trance, what she and Billy have done. As the trance continues, she senses that the girl was not killed. Billy tells the police where he hid the ransom money and reveals that he left Amanda unconscious where she would be found by scouts who were camping nearby, which the police already know, confirming that she is all right.

Cast

Production

Casting
According to Jon Krampner's biography Female Brando: The Legend of Kim Stanley, Forbes and Attenborough initially had encountered difficulty in casting the role of Myra. Deborah Kerr and Simone Signoret originally were approached for the part, but both actresses turned down the role.

Forbes and Attenborough then contacted Kim Stanley, an American theatre and television actress whose previous film work was limited to starring in the 1958 feature The Goddess and providing the uncredited opening and closing narration for the 1962 adaptation of To Kill a Mockingbird. Attenborough later was quoted as stating that Stanley was the best choice, noting that the "complexity of dramatic impression vital to the credibility of Myra was hard to find. Also an intellectual ability to follow and understand the character. I didn’t believe Simone (Signoret) could convey, as Kim did, the otherworldliness which this woman inhabited in her private fantasies."

Shooting
The film was shot at Pinewood Studios and at various locations around London including Trafalgar Square, Wimbledon, several London Underground stations and the derelict Staines Greyhound Stadium. The film's sets were designed by the art director Ray Simm.

Release

Reception
Critical reaction in the British and American media was overwhelmingly strong. London's Daily Express called the film "superbly atmospheric", and The Sunday Telegraph dubbed it "compassionate, intelligent and absorbing." The New York Herald Tribune called Séance on a Wet Afternoon "the perfect psychological suspense thriller and a flawless film to boot", and The New York Times stated "it isn’t often you see a melodrama that sends you forth with a lump in your throat, as well as a set of muscles weary from being tense for nigh two hours."

The film was a commercial failure, and its losses - along with those of Life for Ruth - caused the demise of the Allied Film Makers company.

Awards and nominations

Remakes
Séance on a Wet Afternoon was remade in 2000 as the Japanese horror film Seance (Kōrei), directed by Kiyoshi Kurosawa. An opera of the same name based on the film, created by Broadway composer Stephen Schwartz, had its world premiere on 26 September 2009, at the Granada Theater at Opera Santa Barbara in California.

References

Bibliography
 Paul Wells, Alan Burton & Tim O'Sullivan. Liberal Directions: Basil Dearden and Postwar British Film Culture. Flicks Books, 1997.

External links
 
 
 

1964 films
1964 crime drama films
1960s English-language films
1960s crime thriller films
1960s psychological thriller films
British black-and-white films
British crime thriller films
British psychological thriller films
Edgar Award-winning works
Films about child abduction
Films about psychic powers
Films adapted into operas
Films and television featuring Greyhound racing
Films based on British novels
Films directed by Bryan Forbes
Films produced by Richard Attenborough
Films scored by John Barry (composer)
Films set in London
Films shot at Pinewood Studios
Films shot in London
Greyhound racing films
1960s British films